Ahn Hae-ryong (born 1961) is a South Korean documentary filmmaker and cinematographer. Ahn is an Asia Press writer and focused on the forgotten history of Korea by travelling in East and Southeast Asia.

Ahn's documentary film My Heart Is Not Broken Yet (2009) documents former comfort woman Song Sin-do.

He released The Truth Shall Not Sink with Sewol in 2014 and won Grand Prize at the Fukuoka Asian Film Festival in 2015.

Filmography 
Beullaekkorian (블랙코리안, short film, 1996) - director 
Silent Crying  (documentary short, 2003) - director, cinematographer, producer
Osaka Eleven: A Story of Osaka Korean High school Soccer Team (documentary, 2007) - co-producer
My Heart Is Not Broken Yet (documentary, 2009) - director, cinematographer
The Truth Shall Not Sink with Sewol (documentary, 2014) - director
Pungjine Muthin Manghyangga (풍진에 묻힌 망향가, short film) - director

References

External links 
 
 
 

1961 births
Living people
South Korean film directors
South Korean screenwriters
Place of birth missing (living people)